Robert Albert Trapp (December 19, 1897 – November 20, 1979) was a Canadian professional ice hockey forward who played 83 games in the National Hockey League for the Montreal Canadiens and Chicago Black Hawks. Trapp also played for the Edmonton Eskimos in the Western Canada Hockey League.

He was born in Pembroke, Ontario.

External links

Bobby Trapp's profile at Hockey Reference.com

1897 births
1979 deaths
Canadian ice hockey forwards
Chicago Blackhawks players
Edmonton Eskimos (ice hockey) players
Ice hockey people from Ontario
Montreal Canadiens players
Portland Rosebuds players
Providence Reds players
Sportspeople from Pembroke, Ontario
Tulsa Oilers (AHA) players
Canadian expatriate ice hockey players in the United States